Look Out – Phineas Is Back! is an album by American jazz pianist Phineas Newborn Jr. recorded in 1976 but not released on the Pablo label until 1978.

Reception
The Allmusic review by Scott Yanow states "On what would be one of his final sessions, Newborn is in surprisingly strong form playing in a trio".

Track listing
All compositions by Phineas Newborn Jr. except as indicated
 "Salt Peanuts" (Kenny Clarke, Dizzy Gillespie) – 5:40
 "The Man I Love" (George Gershwin, Ira Gershwin) – 5:14
 "You Are the Sunshine of My Life" (Stevie Wonder) – 6:19
 "Abbers Song" (Ray Brown) – 4:19
 "Tamarind Blues" – 5:26
 "A Night in Tunisia" (Gillespie, Frank Paparelli)  – 4:49
 "Sometimes I'm Happy" (Irving Caesar, Vincent Youmans) – 5:42
 "Donald's Dream" – 4:59
 "Just in Time" (Betty Comden, Adolph Green, Jule Styne) – 2:57 Bonus track on CD reissue

Personnel
Phineas Newborn Jr. – piano
Ray Brown – bass
Jimmy Smith – drums

References

Pablo Records albums
Phineas Newborn Jr. albums
1978 albums